Bangladesh–Panama relations refer to the bilateral relations between Bangladesh and Panama. Both the countries enjoy cordial relations with intentions to expand it further. Neither country has a resident ambassador.

High level visits 
Former foreign secretary of Bangladesh Mohamed Mijarul Quayes paid an official visit to Panama City in 2011.

Political cooperation 
In 1977, Bangladesh supported Panama in the handover of Panama Canal from United States to Panama through the Torrijos–Carter Treaties.

Cooperation in shipping 
Because of Panama's vast experience in international shipping services, Bangladesh has sought Panama's assistance in this sector. In 2013, Bangladesh and Panama signed a bilateral agreement through which Bangladeshi seamen were granted job opportunities in Panama's shipping sector.

Economic cooperation 
Both Bangladesh and Panama have expressed deep interests in strengthening the bilateral economic activities between the two countries. In 2011, a Bangladeshi business delegation coordinated by the commerce ministry paid a visit to Panama to explore potential ways for expanding bilateral trade and investment.

See also  
 Foreign relations of Bangladesh
 Foreign relations of Panama

References 

Panama
Bilateral relations of Panama